Kurtziella antipyrgus is a species of sea snail, a marine gastropod mollusk in the family Mangeliidae.

Description
The length of the shell varies between 7 mm and 10 mm, its diameter 2.5 mm.

Distribution
This marine species occurs in the Pacific Ocean from Acapulco, Pacific Mexico, to Ecuador

References

 H. A. Pilsbry and H. N. Lowe, West Mexican and Central American Mollusks Collected by H. N. Lowe, 1929-31; Proceedings of the Academy of Natural Sciences of Philadelphia Vol. 84 (1932), pp. 33–144

External links
  Tucker, J.K. 2004 Catalog of recent and fossil turrids (Mollusca: Gastropoda). Zootaxa 682:1–1295.
 

antipyrgus
Gastropods described in 1932